EMI Records (formerly EMI Records Ltd.) is a multinational record label owned by Universal Music Group. It originally founded as a British flagship label by the music company of the same name in 1972, and launched in January 1973 as the successor to its Columbia and Parlophone record labels. The label was later launched worldwide. It has a branch in India called EMI Records India, run by director Mohit Suri. In 2014, Universal Music Japan revived the label in Japan as the successor to EMI Records Japan. In June 2020, Universal revived the label as the successor to Virgin EMI, with Virgin Records now operating as an imprint of EMI Records.

History

An EMI Records Ltd. legal entity was created in 1956 as the record manufacturing and distribution arm of EMI in the UK. It oversaw EMI's various labels, including The Gramophone Co. Ltd., Columbia Graphophone Company, and Parlophone Co. Ltd.

The global success that EMI enjoyed in the 1960s exposed the fact that the company had the rights to only some of its trademarks in some parts of the world, most notably His Master's Voice and Columbia, with RCA Victor and the American Columbia Records owning the rights to these trademarks in North America.

Complicating matters was Columbia's formation of its own operations in the UK by purchasing Oriole Records and changing its name to that of its then-parent company CBS (the legal trademark designation bearing the full name of the parent company, "Trade Mark of Columbia Broadcasting System, Inc."), and as CBS Records International becoming highly successful, a serious rival to EMI, in the UK.

In July 1965, the standalone EMI Record labels were extracted from E.M.I. Records Ltd. and folded into The Gramophone Company Ltd. On 1 July 1973, The Gramophone Co. Ltd. was renamed EMI Records Ltd. At the same time, E.M.I. Records Ltd. was wound down and its activities were absorbed into EMI Records Ltd.

Earlier, on 1 January 1973, all of The Gramophone Company Ltd. pop labels (Columbia, Parlophone, Harvest, Sovereign and Regal) had been rebranded as EMI. EMI Records then signed new music artists that became worldwide successes: Kraftwerk, Renaissance, Queen, Olivia Newton-John, Iron Maiden, Kate Bush, Sheena Easton, and Pink Floyd (though some of these acts were on different labels in the US, not EMI's Capitol Records). In 1978, EMI launched EMI America Records as its second label in the United States after Capitol, and in 1988, EMI America later merged with sister label Manhattan Records, founded in 1984, becoming EMI Manhattan Records and eventually EMI USA when Capitol absorbed it in 1989. In 1997, EMI Records' American division was folded into Virgin Records and Capitol.

In October 1979, EMI Ltd. merged with Thorn Electrical Industries to become Thorn EMI, whose shareholders voted on 16 August 1996 in favour of demerging Thorn from EMI again. The recorded music division became EMI Group plc, and the electronics and rentals divisions were divested as Thorn plc.

In 2010, EMI Records opened a country music division, EMI Records Nashville, which includes on its roster Troy Olsen, Alan Jackson, Kelleigh Bannen, and Eric Church. EMI Records Nashville is a sister label to the Capitol Nashville unit of Universal Music Group.

Australia's most prolific artist, Slim Dusty, signed with the Columbia Graphophone Co. for Regal Zonophone Records in 1946 and remained with EMI until his death in 2003, selling over 7 million records for the label in Australia by 2007.

Virgin EMI Records retained use of the EMI branding after Universal Music Group's acquisition of EMI in September 2012, but it is otherwise unrelated to the old label which was defunct and renamed Parlophone Records in 2013 and is now part of Warner Music Group. EMI Christian Music Group was renamed Capitol Christian Music Group. EMI Classics was sold to Warner Music Group in February 2013. After EU regulatory approval, EMI Classics was absorbed into Warner Classics in July 2013. The reissues of pre-1997 releases from EMI America and EMI Records USA are handled by UMG's Capitol Music Group, Virgin Records' American distributor and a stand-alone British distributor. The distributors of the vast majority of EMI Records' UK catalogue are Rhino Entertainment in the US and WEA International for the world outside the US.

In April 2013, EMI Music Japan became defunct following Universal's acquisition of EMI. The company's successor was EMI Records Japan, a sublabel of Universal Music Japan. In February 2014, Universal Japan did a label reorganization, with more than half of the former EMI Records Japan artists being transferred to Nayutawave Records. Later that year, the two sublabels were combined and rebranded as EMI Records. Since 2018, Takeshi Okada has been the managing director of Universal Japan's EMI Records label. In 2020, the label launched an official YouTube channel, six years after the label was formed.

On 16 June 2020, Universal rebranded Virgin EMI Records as EMI Records and named Rebecca Allen (former president of UMG's Decca label) as the label's president.

In September 2020, Universal launched Motown UK, under EMI Records.

In January 2023, EMI launched EMI North, based in Leeds, becoming the "first major to open a physical space outside of London".

EMI United Kingdom
EMI United Kingdom is a brand of EMI Records that, despite the name, appeared worldwide between roughly 1993 and 1998, used mainly for artists such as Iron Maiden, Kraftwerk and Pink Floyd, as a sister imprint to Parlophone, EMI Premiere, hEMIsphere, Eminence, EMI Gold and the home video division Picture Music International. During the '90s, it reissued albums that originally bore the Harvest Records, Columbia Graphophone Company, RAK Records, Regal Zonophone, HMV, Music for Pleasure and Starline labels. As of 2013, EMI UK's catalogue is owned by Warner Music Group after the acquisition of the Parlophone Label Group's assets. By contrast, UMG owns the catalogue of reissues from Deep Purple's albums between 1972 to 1975 on the band's vanity label Purple, in addition to their last albums for EMI in Europe, Abandon and Bananas.

See also
Abbey Road Studios
List of record labels
List of EMI Records artists

References

External Links 

 
 
 
 

British record labels
1972 establishments in the United Kingdom
2013 disestablishments in the United Kingdom
2020 establishments in the United Kingdom
Record labels established in 1972
Record labels disestablished in 2013
Record labels established in 2020
2014 establishments in Japan
Pop record labels
Electronic dance music record labels
Rock record labels
EMI
Jazz record labels
Labels distributed by Universal Music Group
Universal Music Group
Universal Music Japan